Gerstell is a surname. Notable people with the surname include:

Ellen Gerstell (born 1954), American voice actress
Glenn S. Gerstell, American lawyer

See also
Gerstell, West Virginia